KAVX (91.9 FM) is a radio station licensed to Lufkin, Texas, United States. The station is owned by Lufkin Educational Broadcasting Foundation.

KAVX broadcasts a religious radio format.

The station was assigned the KAVX call sign by the Federal Communications Commission on June 27, 1997.

References

External links
KAVX official website

Radio stations established in 1998
Angelina County, Texas
AVX
1998 establishments in Texas